Arthur F. Spinney, Jr. (1927–1994) was an American gridiron football guard. He played nine seasons with the Baltimore Colts in the National Football League (NFL) and was captain of the 1949 Eagles' football team. Spinney attended Boston College. He missed the 1951 and 1952 NFL seasons due to military service.

After his career he served as an offensive line coach for Boston College and the Boston Patriots under Mike Holovak and was also a public relations official. For a brief time, Spinney worked for the American Biltrite Rubber Company of Cambridge, Massachusetts, as a consultant to its Sports Surfaces Division. In 1972, along with Lawrence J. Warnalis of Medford, Massachusetts, Spinney was awarded a patent that described Biltrite's artificial grass product Poly-Turf as well as its associated layers of product, applied on top of asphalt, as a suitable way to construct a football or soccer field with artificial turf. This provided maximum comfort and safety to the players.

Spinney was inducted into the Boston College Varsity Club Athletic Hall of Fame in 1972.

Former Governor of Massachusetts Edward J. King, who played college football with Spinney, said of him "He was the toughest single person I ever encountered, he handed out punishment with clean hard-hitting, but he'd play himself into total fatigue.  As an individual, he was one good solid American man.

References 

1927 births
1994 deaths
American football offensive linemen
Baltimore Colts (1947–1950) players
Baltimore Colts players
Western Conference Pro Bowl players
Boston College Eagles football players
Boston College Eagles football coaches
People from Saugus, Massachusetts
Boston Patriots (AFL) coaches
Players of American football from Massachusetts
Sportspeople from Essex County, Massachusetts